Hand rubbing is a gesture that conveys in many cultures either that one has a feeling of excited expectation, or that one is simply cold. In Ekman and Friesen's 1969 classification system for gestures, hand-rubbing as an indication of coldness is an emblem intentional gesture that could equally well be verbalized.

Cultural differences
The gesture is widespread around the globe, although it is possibly more common in cultures of countries with colder climates than those with hotter climates. In South America, the gesture is used to imply that two women are lesbians.

Hand rubbing involves rubbing the palms of one's hands together. As a gesture of expectation, the rate at which one rubs the palms together is significant. A fast pace indicates expectation of something good for oneself. But a slow pace indicates expectation of something bad for someone else. Context also affects the meaning of the gesture. In context, the meaning can vary from an indicator of internal (anticipatory) tension to meaning "Oh good!".

In drama, rubbing hands can signify various things, such as a miser rubbing his palms together over money, Lady Macbeth washing the blood off her hands, a villain having just done a wicked deed, or a person simply anticipating a journey, a good meal, or meeting with a boyfriend/girlfriend.

A psychological study of revenge by Robert Baron, a psychologist in the school of management at Rensselaer Polytechnic Institute, found that some people who had waited years to get even with others, plotting and waiting for the opportunity to "torpedo their enemy's career", would rub their hands together at the memory, in the fashion of cartoon villains.

John Bulwer calls Lady Macbeth's hand rubbing gesture Gestus #XI: Innocentiam Ostendo (Latin for "I display innocence"). He states that "[t]o imitate the posture of washing the hands by rubbing the back of one in the hollow of the other with a kind of detersive motion is a gesture sometimes used by those who would profess their innocency and declare they have no Hand in that foul business, not so much as by their manuall assent […] for the Hands naturally imply, as it were in Hieroglyph, men's acts and operations; and that cleansing motion denotes the cleanness of their actions.". This gesture is also associated with Pilate and with Shakespeare's other plays Julius Caesar (where Brutus' hand-washing gesture is turned from a profession of innocency into a signal of guilt) and Richard II.

References

Further reading 
 

Hand gestures
Articles containing video clips